Live at the Marquee may refer to:

Live at the Marquee (festival), an annual music festival in Cork, Ireland
Live at the Marquee (Dream Theater album), 1993
Live at the Marquee (Gary Moore album), 1980
Live at the Marquee (King Crimson album), 1998
Live at the Marquee (Girl album), 2001
Live at the Marquee 1980, a live album by British rock band Atomic Rooster
Live at the Marquee Theatre, an album by The Format
Live at the Marquee (DVD), a 2003 video album by Jesus Jones
Live at the Marquee (Jesus Jones album), 2005
Live at the Marquee (Osibisa album), 1984
Live at the Marquee (Nathan Carter album)
"Live at the Marquee", a song by The Vapors on their album Magnets